Sneathia is a Gram-negative, rod-shaped, non-spore-forming and non-motile genus of bacteria from the family of Leptotrichiaceae. Species have been identified as pathogens associated with bacterial vaginosis.

Sneathia is named of the microbiologist H. A. Snaeth.

References

Further reading 
 
 
 
 
 

Fusobacteriota
Bacteria genera